A statue of José Clemente Orozco is installed in Centro, Guadalajara, in the Mexican state of Jalisco.

External links

 

Outdoor sculptures in Guadalajara
Rotonda de los Jaliscienses Ilustres
Sculptures of men in Mexico
Statues in Jalisco